Bosh (born c. 1992) is a French rapper of Congolese origin from Plaisir, a western suburb of Paris. He specializes in street rap and deals with subjects of drugs, violence and youth problems. He became well known through the web series Dans le kartier released on YouTube in 2009. He was in the rap formation BLK, a collective of 9 rappers and musicians including Bosh. He was also part of the rap group 78. He gained further clout in 2016 with the freestyle series Mal dominant. He released his mixtape Dos Argenté in June 2018 followed by the very successful album Synkinisi in March 2020. He has had a role as Karnage in Validé, directed by Franck Gastambide on Canal+ station.<ref>[http://www.allocine.fr/article/fichearticle_gen_carticle=18688920.html Alociné: Validé sur Canal+Séries : qui sont Sam's et Bosh, les interprètes de Mastar et Karnage?] </ref>

Discography
Albums and mixtapes

Singles

*Did not appear in the official Belgian Ultratop 50 charts, but rather in the bubbling under Ultratip charts.

Featured in

Other charting songs

Filmography
2020: Validé'' as Karnage (TV series)

References

French rappers
1993 births
Living people
Black French musicians
21st-century French male musicians